The Top Holiday Albums chart is a seasonal chart published weekly by Billboard during October, November, December, and January. It tracks the best-selling holiday albums in the United States. Throughout the 2010s, many albums, compilation albums, extended plays, and soundtrack albums reached the top spot of the chart. Italian opera singer and songwriter Andrea Bocelli received the first number one of the 2010s with his album My Christmas (2009).

Several artists collected multiple number one albums during the decade. Lady Antebellum first visited the top of the chart with their EP A Merry Little Christmas in 2010, and returned with their fourth studio album, On This Winter's Night, in 2012. American a cappella group Pentatonix scored four number ones with That's Christmas to Me (2014), A Pentatonix Christmas (2016), Christmas Is Here! (2018), and The Best of Pentatonix Christmas (2019), totaling 40 non-consecutive weeks at the chart's summit. That's Christmas to Me and A Pentatonix Christmas accounted for 18 weeks at the top each, with the former album occupying the top position for 10 of the 12 weeks during the 2014-2015 holiday season. Pentatonix has sold over 4.5 million holiday albums in the US, as of December 2019. Mariah Carey's Merry Christmas II You debuted at the top spot in November 2010, while her first holiday album Merry Christmas (1994) reached number one in November 2019 following the release of its deluxe edition. Because of Carey's surge in popularity during the holiday season, she is often referred to by publications as the "Queen of Christmas".

The soundtrack to the 1993 film The Nightmare Before Christmas reached the top spot several times throughout the decade, with a special edition release of album also reaching number one in 2015. Scottish singer Susan Boyle released her second studio album, The Gift, in 2010 to commercial success, simultaneously topping both the Top Holiday Albums and the main all-genre Billboard 200 chart. It went on to sell 3.7 million copies during the 2010-2011 season. In 2013, Duck the Halls: A Robertson Family Christmas, an album performed by the cast of the American reality television series Duck Dynasty, reached the top of the chart for five non-consecutive weeks. It also reached number one on Billboards Top Country Albums, selling 138,000 copies in its first four weeks. American singer Reba McEntire previously appeared on the Top Holiday Albums chart in 1994 and 2000, but achieved her first number one on the chart with My Kind of Christmas in 2016. Several of the albums on the list, including Carey's Merry Christmas, Michael Bublé's Christmas (2011), and Celine Dion's These Are Special Times (1998), are among the best-selling holiday albums of all time in the US.

Chart history

See also 
 List of best-selling Christmas albums in the United States

References

External links 
 Current Top Holiday Albums chart at Billboard

Holiday albums
United States Holiday Albums